R403 road  may refer to:
 R403 road (Ireland)
 R403 road (South Africa)